Cameron "Cam" McDonald (22 June 1940 – 13 February 2014) was an Australian rules footballer who played with Footscray in the Victorian Football League (VFL).

McDonald was a follower for Footscray in the 1961 VFL Grand Final, which they lost to Hawthorn. He had earlier in the year sought a clearance to Collingwood, but it was refused.

References

External links
 
 

1940 births
2014 deaths
Western Bulldogs players
Australian players of Australian rules football